University District can refer to a location in the United States:
University District, Detroit, Michigan
University District, Columbus, Ohio
University District, San Bernardino, California
University District, Seattle, Washington
University District, Spokane, Washington